Pau Miquel Delgado (born 20 August 2000) is a Spanish cyclist who currently rides for UCI ProTeam .

Career
Pau turned Professional with the UCI ProTeam  in 2022 after spending three years at its feeder team. During Stage 5 of the 2022 Adriatica Ionica Race Miquel finished second in the breakaway behind Christian Scaroni. During Stage 3 Miquel made it into the break of the day staying away for 175 kilomtres, he was awarded the Combativity award for being most active during the stage and will start stage 4 with a yellow number.

Major results
2017
 3rd Time trial, National Junior Road Championships
2021
 1st 
 1st 
 2nd 
2022
  Combativity award Stage 3 Vuelta a España

Grand Tour general classification results timeline

References

External links

2000 births
Living people
Spanish male cyclists
Cyclists from Catalonia
People from Vallès Occidental
Sportspeople from the Province of Barcelona
21st-century Spanish people